Steinmüller is a surname. Notable people with the surname include:

Angela Steinmüller (born 1941), German mathematician and science fiction author
Christian Gottlob Steinmüller (1792–1864), German pipe organ builder
Hanna Steinmüller (born 1993), German politician
Karlheinz Steinmüller (born 1950), German physicist and science fiction author

See also
The Dream Master (Steinmüller novel), German science fiction novel

References

Surnames of German origin